Abbas Adham ( Abbās Adham, 1885 – 31 October 1969) was an Iranian physician  and politician who served as health minister (Surgeon Ministry) in Abdolhossein Hazhir and Mohammad Sa'ed cabinets. He was called Alam-ol-molk  as honorific address. Abbas Adham worked for Ahmad Shah Qajar as a personal doctor. He also was head of Tehran-resident Azerbaijani people community. Abbas Adham was a member of Red Lion and Sun Society directorate and senator-elect of Senate of Iran.

References

 
 Abbas Adham  Pezashknama

1885 births
1969 deaths
Politicians from Tabriz
Government ministers of Iran
Physicians from Tabriz